Hanumanthanpatti is a town panchayat located in Uthamapalayam taluk, Theni district in the state of Tamil Nadu, India.

Demographics
At the 2001 India census, Hanumanthampatti had a population of 9,436 (males 50%; females 50%). Hanumanthampatti had an average literacy rate of 63%, higher than the national average of 59.5%. Male literacy was 73%, and female literacy was 54%. In Hanumanthampatti, 12% of the population were under 6 years of age.

References

Cities and towns in Theni district